Train in the Snow is a Croatian (then SFR Yugoslavia) children and adventure film directed by Mate Relja. It was released on June 10, 1976.

It is based on the children's novel Vlak u snijegu written by Mato Lovrak (1899–1974), then a young schoolteacher inspired by actual events, in 1933,  and first titled Djeca Velikog Sela ("The Children of Veliko Selo").

Plot
At the behest of their teacher,  fourth grade schoolchildren in a small Croatian village found an old-style Slavic Zadruga and organize a field trip to Zagreb. 
On their way back, their teacher gets ill and must stay in a hospital. 
As the children travel back on their own,  the train gets blocked by a snowdrift. 
With the help of the children, the railroad workers  manage to clear the way.

Cast 
 Slavko Štimac - Ljuban Marić
 Gordana Inkret - Draga
 Željko Malčić - Pero
 Edo Peročević - Conductor
 Ratko Buljan - Teacher
 Antun Nalis - Newspaper editor

Locations
The film was shot from 1973 to 1976.

Most of the children came from the Regional school of Velika Ciglena near Bjelovar,  which was then part of Dr Franko Vinter Elementary School in Bjelovar,  now 1st Elementary School Bjelovar.

The scenes in Zagreb were taken at the Main train station, the Funicular, the Dolac Market, the National Theatre, the Zoo and a printing press.

Some scenes  were  filmed at the Rovišće railway station near Bjelovar.

The scenes in the school were shot in the village of Tomaš near Bjelovar,  and 
the scenes in the snow  near Grginac on the railroad between Bjelovar and Kloštar Podravski,  with snow-blowers from Planica in Slovenia to provide artificial snow. 
At the end of the shooting,  several scenes could be taken in real snow,  which had started falling.

First appearances
The film was first released in Bjelovar on June 10, 1976.
On the same year it was shown at the International Children's Festival of Šibenik  and at the Pula Film Festival, where it received the Jelen ("Deer") award—the first children's film to receive it. 
It has been shown in 30 countries.

Trains
A replica of the train from the film has been installed at the Lovrak center in Veliki Grđevac. 
The name of the novelist, Mato Lovrak, has now been given to the Bjelovar-Kloštar Podravski line.

Theme song
The theme  song "Kad se male ruke slože" ("When little hands join together"),  written by popular singer Arsen Dedić,  is a tale of friendship and solidarity. 
The text,  written by Drago Britvić, starts this way:

"Kad se mnogo malih složi,
"Ta se snaga stoput množi,
"A to znači da smo jači,
"Kad se skupimo u roj.
"Mala iskra požar skriva,
"Kap po kap i rijeka biva.
"Hajde zato svi u jato,
"Kao vrapci živ, živ, živ."

Ref: 
"Kad se male ruke slože, sve se može, sve se može."

References

Further reading

External links
 
 Croatian film archive: List of Croatian films from 1944 to 2006

1976 films
1970s Croatian-language films
1970s children's adventure films
Films based on Croatian novels
Croatian children's films
Yugoslav adventure films
Croatian adventure films
Films set in Yugoslavia
Films set in Croatia